Robinsonův ostrov was a Czech reality television program debuting in 2017. In 2016, TV Nova bought the broadcast rights to air their own version of Expedition Robinson.

The name alludes to both Robinson Crusoe and The Swiss Family Robinson, two stories featuring people being marooned by shipwrecks.

Seasons

External links
 http://robinson.nova.cz/

Czech Republic
Czech reality television series
Czech Republic
TV Nova (Czech TV channel) original programming